Heathfield Park SSSI is a  biological Site of Special Scientific Interest east of Heathfield in East Sussex. It is part of Heathfield Park, a Grade II* listed building and park.

This is a steep valley carved by a stream. The sheltered wooded habitat has a warm and moist microclimate and it has a number of plant species usually restricted to western Britain, such as Cornish moneywort, hay-scented buckler-fern and the liverwort Frullania tamarisci. The site is also important for lichens and 76 species have been recorded.

The site is private land with no public access.

References

Sites of Special Scientific Interest in East Sussex